George Hull may refer to:
George C. Hull (1878–1953), American screenwriter
George W. Hull (1870–1951), Wisconsin state senator
George Hull (Massachusetts politician) (1788–1868), Lieutenant Governor of Massachusetts 1836–1843
George Hull, tobacconist and perpetrator of the Cardiff Giant hoax in 1869